The Lt. Raymond Enners Award is an award given annually to the NCAA's most outstanding player in men's college lacrosse.  The award is presented by the United States Intercollegiate Lacrosse Association (USILA) and is named after 1st Lt. Raymond J. Enners, who attended the United States Military Academy, class of 1967, and served in the U.S. Army during the Vietnam War. While leading a platoon, he was killed in combat on September 18, 1968.  Enners received the Distinguished Service Cross, the Bronze Star Medal, and the Purple Heart for extraordinary heroism in combat in South Vietnam. He was a member of the 1963 All-Long Island lacrosse team, a 1967 USILA Honorable Mention All-American, and was inducted into the Suffolk County Hall of Fame in 2004.  The award was first given in the season immediately after his death.  The Lt. Ray Enners Award, another award named after Lt. Enners, is presented annually by the Suffolk County Boys Lacrosse Coaches Association to the outstanding high school player in Suffolk County, New York. Frank Urso is the only athlete who has won both awards, in 1972 and 1975. 
In 2016, Richard Enners authored the book "Heart of Gray", the story about his brother LT. Raymond J. Enners, Alpha Company, 1-20th Infantry, 11th Brigade and his courage and sacrifice in Vietnam.

Award Winners by Year

Universities with Multiple Award Winners

See also
Tewaaraton Outstanding Player Award
Jack Turnbull Outstanding Attackman Award
Lt. j.g. Donald MacLaughlin Jr. Outstanding Midfielder Award
William C. Schmeisser Outstanding Defender Award
Ensign C. Markland Kelly Jr. Outstanding  Goaltender Award
F. Morris Touchstone Outstanding Coach Award

References

External links
US Lacrosse Awards page

College lacrosse trophies and awards in the United States
Lacrosse trophies and awards
Awards established in 1969